Peter White (born 20 September 1954) is an English musician and composer who plays guitar, piano, accordion and harmonica. He is known for his 20-year collaboration with Al Stewart.

Musical career

Early career with Al Stewart
Born in Luton, England, White first gained fame with his distinctive guitar style as accompanist to singer/songwriter Al Stewart. He started in Stewart's band in 1975 at the age of 20, then moved to Los Angeles in 1978. During a 20-year tenure with Stewart, he co-wrote many songs, including Stewart's 1978 top-ten hit "Time Passages" and “Midnight Rocks” (which reached #24 on the US charts) in 1980. That same year he formed Shot In The Dark, a band which backed Stewart and released an eponymous album in 1981.

Basia
In 1984, White’s brother Danny White, one of the founders of Matt Bianco, invited him to play on the Matt Bianco debut album Whose Side Are You On?. He played acoustic guitar (uncredited) on the song "Half A Minute"--the first time that the two brothers collaborated musically. In 1987 White continued his association with Matt Bianco's singer, Basia Trzetrzelewska, by playing guitar on her Time and Tide album, co-produced by his brother. He played on all of Basia’s following studio albums and joined her on two world tours, in 1990 and 1994. In 1996 Basia returned the favor by singing on White's album Caravan of Dreams, on the single "Just Another Day".

Producing and solo work
In 1989 White co-produced the album “The Clock and the Moon” by singer Skipper Wise. In return Wise co-produced White’s first two solo albums, Reveillez-Vous in 1990 and Excusez-Moi in 1992.  Many other solo albums by Peter White followed which resulted in several songs reaching the top of the Billboard Smooth Jazz Songs chart. #1 hits include  "Midnight in Manhattan", featuring Grover Washington, Jr. (1998), "What Does It Take (To Win Your Love)" featuring Sam Riney (2006), "Mister Magic" featuring Bob James (2007), "Bright" (2009), "Good Day (2010), "Here We Go" featuring Dave Sanborn (2012), "Head Over Heels" featuring Rick Braun (2014), and "Do I Do" (2017).

Even after releasing three solo CDs, White continued to work with Al Stewart and Basia, eventually co-producing Stewart’s Famous Last Words CD in 1993. As a solo artist White has recorded and performed with many other instrumental artists including Boney James, Rick Braun, Richard Elliot, Grover Washington Jr., Gerald Albright, Dave Koz, and Brian Culbertson.

Discography

Albums 
{| class="wikitable" style="text-align:center;"
|-
! scope="col" | Year
! scope="col" | Title
! scope="col" |US Jazz
! scope="col" |US Con. Jazz
! scope="col" |Label
|-
|1990
|Réveillez-Vous 
|
|
|Chase Music
|-
|1991
|Excusez-Moi 
|
|14
|rowspan="3"|Sindrome
|-
|1993
|Promenade 
|36
|8
|-
|1994
|Reflections
|16
|13
|-
|1996
|Caravan of Dreams 
|4
|5
|rowspan="6"|Columbia
|-
|1997
|Songs of the Season 
|13
|9
|-
|1998
|Perfect Moment
|3
|3
|-
|2001 
|Glow
|4
|2
|-
|2004 
|Confidential
|3
|2
|-
|2006 
|Playin' Favourites
|4
|2
|-
|2007
|Peter White Christmas 
|12
|5
|ARTizen
|-
|2009
|Good Day 
|2
|2
|Peak 
|-
|2013
|Here We Go
|3
|1
|rowspan="3"|Heads Up
|-
|2014
|Smile
|3
|1
|-
|2016
|Groovin'''
|2
|1
|-
|2019
|Music for STARLUX Airlines|14
|3
|Lobster Music
|-
|}

 Singles 

 Awards 
Peter White won the award for best Smooth Jazz Musician in the 2007 Canadian Smooth Jazz Awards. He was named the Best Guitarist at the National Smooth Jazz Awards for four consecutive years from 2000–2003.

In 2000, White won three Oasis Contemporary Jazz Awards: 
CD of the Year for Perfect Moment''
Song of the Year for "Midnight in Manhattan" with Grover Washington, Jr.
Best Guitarist

References

External links
 Official site

1954 births
Living people
People from Luton
20th-century guitarists
21st-century guitarists
Male guitarists
Smooth jazz guitarists
Columbia Records artists
Heads Up International artists
20th-century male musicians
21st-century male musicians
Male jazz musicians
Windows (band) members